Pandit Vijay Sardeshmukh (23 June 1952 – 5 October 2019)  was an Indian classical vocalist and disciple of Kumar Gandharva. Vijay was an honored guru for post graduation studies in Pune University.

Career
Pt. Vijay Sardeshmukh, born in June 1952 was initiated into music by his father, Vitthalrao Sardeshmukh. Vitthalrao was a Sanskrit pandit, a vocalist (disciple of Sureshbabu Mane of Kirana Gharana) and an accomplished harmonium player. He accompanied many vocalists of renown including Pt. Bhimsen Joshi, Pt. Kumar Gandharva and others. Kumar Gandharva, who was a good friend of Vitthalrao, later became Vijay's Guru. Vijay has learned from Kumar Gandharva 1971 onward. Gifted with a melodious voice, Vijay made his debut in "Swar sadhana Conference" organized in Pune in 1974. Since then he has performed in many concerts of repute, including the Sawai Gandharva and Tansen Samaroha. He was Graded Artist of All India Radio and Doordarshan since 1977. His cassettes and CDs are released by HMV and Alurkar Music House Pune. Amongst Pt. Kumar Gandharva's disciples, Vijay’s presentation is widely recognized as very close to that of his Guru. A meditative quality that prevailed in Kumar Gandharva's music can be richly experienced in Vijay's music. Kumar Gandharva's education always included singing as well as discussion. It was this fusion of thought process and music that Vijay inherited from Kumar Gandharva which prompted concerts like Kalyan Darshan and Tambe Geet Rajani.

Vijay’s voice was molded further under Kumar Gandharva's guidance who was known to be well versed with the science of voice culture. Two Tanpuras, tuned to the highest degree of perfection, play a vital role in Vijay’s music. To quote Kumar Gandharva’s thought behind this, "This is our canvass, how can an artist paint in thin air ?" Drawing on the tanpuras, Vijayjee is known to make the air vibrant with various ragas with minutest of the Shruti differences. Thus entwined, Vijayjee points, in the minds of his audience. Known for his soft-spoken and modest nature Vijay was a man of few words but boundless music within him.

Vijay Sardeshmukh is also a well-known Guru. Many vocalists trained under him such as Shubhada Kulkarni, Pushkar Lele, Ajay Purkar, Tanavi Jagdale-Sardeshmukh, Swarada Godbole, Pritam Nakil, Milap Rane, Mandar Karanjkar etc.

List of Awards
A list of awards received by him.

 Vatsalabai Joshi Award

Personal life
Vijay retired from the service of Bank of India and has devoted his life to classical music. He has two sons Swanand and Swaroop.

Death
Sardeshmukh died on 5 October 2019 in Pune from prolonged illness of blood cancer.

Main Performances

 AARAT BANI - Bal Gandharva Rangamandir, Pune (1986)
 SPIC MACAY, Pune (1988)
 Vishnu Digambar Sangeet Mahotsava, New Delhi (1990)
 Sawai Gandharva Sangeet Mahotsava, Pune (1988, 1994, 2007)
 Kumar Gandharva Mahotsava, Pune (1993)
 Shankarro Bodas Smriti Samaroh, Kanpur (1994)
 Kumarjee Smriti Conference, Kolhapur (1995)
 'Kaal-Jayee', India International Centre, New Delhi (1995)
 'Todi Mahotsava', Mumbai (1995)
 NCPA Mumbai (1999)
 School of Architecture, Ahmedabad (2000)
 Prayaag Sangeet Sammelan, Allahabad (2001)
 ITC Conference, Calcutta (2001)
 Gharana Sammelan, Kolhapur (2001)
 Chaturang Pratishthan, Mumbai (2002)
 Bharat Bhavan, Bhopal  (2005)
 "Nakshtrache Dene" (2005)
 Sur Samvardhan, Pune (2005)
 Dewal Club, Kolhapur (2005)
 Maharashtra Cultural Centre - Thematic presentation on 'Kalyan Darshan' (2006)
 Anahat Nad, Mudgaon (2007)
 Chandrapur Music Conference (2007)
 DV Paluskar Pratishthan, Pune (2007)

References

1952 births
2019 deaths
Hindustani singers
Singers from Pune
21st-century Indian male classical singers
20th-century Khyal singers
20th-century Indian male classical singers